Girls' Generation is a South Korean idol girl group.

Girls' Generation may also refer to:

 "Girls' Generation" (song), a Korean song originally sung by Lee Seung-Cheol
 Girls' Generation (2007 album), the debut album of Girls' Generation
 Girls' Generation (2011 album), the debut Japanese language album of Girls' Generation